Two ships of the British Royal Navy have been named Tactician

 , an  launched in 1918.
 , a T-class submarine launched in 1942

Royal Navy ship names